Satan's Kingdom can refer to:

 Satans Kingdom, Massachusetts
 Satans Kingdom, Vermont
 Satan's Kingdom State Recreation Area, Connecticut